The Liberty Memorial Bridge, across the Missouri River connecting the "twin cities" of Bismarck and Mandan, North Dakota, also known as Missouri River Bridge, was a Warren-Turner through truss structure that was built in 1920. It was listed on the National Register of Historic Places in 1997. It was replaced by a new bridge in 2008 and removed from the National Register in 2009.

It was "the first roadway bridge constructed across the Missouri River, one of the most important waterways in the state" of North Dakota. Not only did the bridge connect the 'twin cities' of Bismarck and Mandan, but for the first time eastern and western North Dakota were joined by a continuous roadway.  Moreover, the bridge was a final link in the coast-to-coast roadway later designated as U.S. Highway 10." Also, it is the only Warren-Turner through truss bridge ever built in the state.

See also

List of bridges documented by the Historic American Engineering Record in North Dakota

References

External links

Road bridges on the National Register of Historic Places in North Dakota
Bridges completed in 1920
Bismarck–Mandan
Historic American Engineering Record in North Dakota
National Register of Historic Places in Bismarck, North Dakota
Interstate 94
U.S. Route 10
Bridges on the Interstate Highway System
Bridges of the United States Numbered Highway System
Warren truss bridges in the United States
Former National Register of Historic Places in North Dakota
Transportation in Burleigh County, North Dakota
Bridges over the Missouri River
1920 establishments in North Dakota